El Viejo Clásico (The Old Classic) also known as El Otro Clásico (The Other Classic) is the name given to any football match between Athletic Bilbao and Real Madrid. Until 10 December 2011, this fixture was the most played in the history of Spanish football, when it was surpassed by El Clásico (between Real Madrid and FC Barcelona). However, it remains the most played game in the Copa del Rey – although only five of the 56 matches took place in the 21st century.

These two clubs, along with Barcelona, are the only participants in all editions of La Liga, the national league championship. Both are owned by their socios (members) who elect a club president to oversee its affairs.

History
Their first meeting occurred in the final of the first edition of the Copa del Rey, played on 8 April 1903; Athletic won 3–2. That match has been identified as a catalyst for the establishment a few weeks later of what would eventually become Club Atlético de Madrid, after some Madrid-based Basque students among the spectators were inspired by the comeback victory by Athletic Bilbao and decided to form a local branch of the club.

Their first match at the original San Mamés took place in that competition in 1920. Meetings became common as Athletic Bilbao and Real Madrid dominated the regional tournaments (Biscay Championship and Madrid Regional Championship respectively), the winning of which granted access to the Copa del Rey.

The Basques and Castilians met in nine Cup finals between 1903 and 1958; Athletic won six of these matches.

First league matches, Francoist Spain and beyond
On 21 April 1929, Athletic Bilbao and Real Madrid met for the first time in La Liga; Real Madrid won the match at Chamartín 5–1. The 1929 Copa del Rey semi-final second leg in Bilbao became known as the 'frog match', after a local company distributed toys which made frog-like noises to increase the noise level in the stadium to distract the visitors, who were 3–1 up from the first leg. The ploy failed resoundingly, with Real Madrid recording a 4–1 win to progress 7–2; however they would lose the final. The two clubs would share ten of the first 25 championships (Athletic six, Madrid four) either side of the Spanish Civil War up to 1956, but from that point Los Blancos became the dominant club in the country, winning 16 titles from 26 available (plus six European Cups).

In that era, the caudillo General Franco used the success of Real Madrid (based in the capital city, the seat of power) as a vehicle to promote the Spanish State to foreigners, whereas Athletic Bilbao – the largest club in the peripheral Basque region whose customs and language were repressed by the central government – won no titles in the same period, only even finishing runners-up once.

The Basques and other regions regained more self-control in the years following Franco's death in 1975, symbolised by the joint display of the banned Basque flag by the captains of Athletic and local rivals Real Sociedad at a match between them a year later. However, many of the supporters of Athletic and Real Madrid, including their Ultras groups (Herri Norte and Ultras Sur respectively), still adhere to opposing views in terms of their national identity. In this regard, the relationship has similarities with the more famous and intense El Clásico rivalry between Real Madrid and Barcelona (representing Catalonia).

On the field, a competitive edge was briefly restored in the early 1980s when Athletic built a strong combative team that won the league twice, finishing ahead of Real Madrid by one point in 1983 with the top spot changing hands on the last day; the season was nothing short of a disaster for the Meringues, who also lost in the finals of the Supercopa, the Copa del Rey (to a last-minute goal), the European Cup Winners' Cup (in extra time), and the Copa de la Liga. In the following campaign, Athletic pipped Madrid by a single goal and better head-to-head record, but their league and cup double that year was the last time they lifted either trophy; Real Madrid soon responded with a run of five-in-a-row, led by their group of homegrown talent, La Quinta del Buitre.

During a hotly-contested fixture in Bilbao in March 1990, the referee awarded a dubious penalty to the away side and had to halt the game for 12 minutes after objects were thrown at the linesman and Madrid goalkeeper Paco Buyo. The match finished as normal, but as a consequence the San Mamés stadium was closed for one match, with Athletic playing Real Valladolid at the Atotxa Stadium in San Sebastián.

21st century

Entering the 21st century, other clubs offered significant challenges to Real Madrid, such as Atlético Madrid (their city rivals who were originally formed as an offshoot of Athletic Bilbao and thus have a similar name, crest and kit), Valencia and Barcelona. Athletic Bilbao were not among this group, now hampered by their self-imposed restrictive Basque-only player policy in an age of worldwide recruitment, exemplified by Madrid's Galácticos who won eight further Champions Leagues between 1998 and 2022.

Real Madrid have a global fanbase and are one of the world's richest, most decorated and best-attended clubs. Athletic have a much lower profile and have occasionally flirted with relegation, although they have consistently ranked among the top half-dozen clubs in Spain for performance, matchday attendance and popularity. Nevertheless, despite the disparities in stature between the two clubs, the fixtures remain keenly fought due to their historical and cultural significance.

There is no doubt who has the upper hand in recent meetings: in 2004–05 Athletic won home and away against Real Madrid, but since then they won just two of their home matches in the dozen seasons up to 2016–17, and took no points at all from the 12 matches at the Bernabéu with Real Madrid registering four or five goals on several occasions; the Merengues also won both legs of the cup tie between the sides in 2006 (they would not be paired again for 15 years).

In April 2011, Real Madrid registered a 3–0 away win over Athletic despite resting several players for important upcoming games, and in the same fixture in May 2012 they achieved the same result and scoreline to clinch their 32nd title in Bilbao, becoming the first visiting team to win the league in the city. Cristiano Ronaldo scored in both matches, and he is Real Madrid's top goalscorer in the fixture, having overtaken Raúl's tally of 15 in 2016. Both Ronaldo and Athletic's Zarra have 17 league goals in the fixture, but Zarra is still some way ahead overall with 24.

The clubs' first meeting in the Supercopa de España was in 2020–21, when Athletic Bilbao defeated La Liga title holders Real Madrid in the semi-final and went on to win the trophy. The outcome was reversed the following season, as Madrid won the 2022 final 2–0 in Saudi Arabia – the first time the two teams had met to directly compete for a trophy since the 1958 Copa del Generalísimo Final. Two weeks after that, Athletic eliminated Real Madrid from the 2021–22 Copa del Rey at the quarter-final stage in their first meeting in the competition since 2006. The first encounter of the 2022–23 season happened in a La Liga match on 22 January 2023, as Madrid earned a 2–0 away win over Athletic.

Head-to-head statistics

Head-to-head ranking in La Liga (1929–2022)

• Total: Athletic Bilbao with 20 higher finishes, Real Madrid with 71 higher finishes (as of the end of the 2021–22 season).

Notable results

Highest scoring games
9 goals:
Real Madrid 3–6 Athletic Bilbao, January 1947, La Liga
Real Madrid 8–1 Athletic Bilbao, June 1960, Copa del Generalísimo semi-final
8 goals:
Athletic Bilbao 6–2 Real Madrid, March 1950, La Liga
Real Madrid 7–1 Athletic Bilbao, September 1980, La Liga
7 goals:
Real Madrid 5–2 Athletic Bilbao, March 1935, La Liga
Athletic Bilbao 2–5 Real Madrid, November 1950, La Liga
Athletic Bilbao 2–5 Real Madrid, March 2009, La Liga

Biggest wins
7 goal margin:
Real Madrid 8–1 Athletic Bilbao, June 1960, Copa del Generalísimo semi-final
6 goal margin:
Real Madrid 0–6 Athletic Bilbao, January 1931, La Liga
Real Madrid 6–0 Athletic Bilbao, November 1957, La Liga
Real Madrid 7–1 Athletic Bilbao, September 1980, La Liga
5 goal margin:
Athletic Bilbao 5–0 Real Madrid, April 1923, Copa del Rey
Athletic Bilbao 5–0 Real Madrid, February 1970, La Liga
Real Madrid 5–0 Athletic Bilbao, March 1988, La Liga
Real Madrid 5–0 Athletic Bilbao, February 1992, La Liga
Athletic Bilbao 0–5 Real Madrid, January 1996, La Liga
Real Madrid 5–0 Athletic Bilbao, October 2014, La Liga

Personnel at both clubs

Players
Over their long histories, only ten players have played for both clubs in La Liga (all Basques, due to Athletic's policy):

Luis Bergareche
Juan Urquizu

Manolín
Mikel Lasa
Rafael Alkorta
Aitor Karanka

The careers of Alkorta and Karanka closely mirrored one another: both central defenders, each started at Athletic then had a successful spell at Real Madrid before returning to Bilbao, with Karanka – five years younger – actually replacing Alkorta at every turn.

Ismael Urzaiz, who played over 400 times for Athletic, started his career at Real Madrid's La Fabrica academy in the 1990s but did not make a league appearance for the club.  Decades earlier, others were contracted to both clubs but only appeared in La Liga for one, including .

Managers 
Five coaches have been at the helm of both clubs:
Lippo Hertzka
Antonio Barrios
Baltasar Albéniz
Juan Antonio Ipiña
Jupp Heynckes

The early Madrid player and manager Arthur Johnson is also named by some sources as being manager of Athletic Bilbao, but the club does not include him in the list on their website.

See also
Athletic–Barcelona clásico
Basque derby
El Clásico
Madrid derby
National and regional identity in Spain
Nationalism and sport

References

Notes

Football rivalries in Spain
Real Madrid CF
Athletic Bilbao
Football in the Basque Country (autonomous community)
Football in the Community of Madrid
Politics and sports
Recurring sporting events established in 1903
Nicknamed sporting events